Metachanda sublevata is a moth species in the oecophorine tribe Metachandini. It was described by Edward Meyrick in 1924.

References

Oecophorinae
Moths described in 1924
Taxa named by Edward Meyrick